The 2011 Fujitsu V8 Supercars Series was the twelfth running of the V8 Supercar Development series, an Australian touring car racing series for V8 Supercars. It acted as the principal support category at seven 2011 International V8 Supercars Championship events. The series began on 17 March at the Adelaide Street Circuit and ended on 3 December at the Homebush Street Circuit after 17 races held at seven rounds. 

Andrew Thompson, driving a Triple Eight Race Engineering prepared Holden VE Commodore, dominated the series, winning eleven of the 17 races. Thompson won by 306 points over Jack Perkins who drove a Sonic Motor Racing Services Ford BF Falcon. Perkins defeated third placed David Russell (MW Motorsport Ford BF Falcon) by seven points, after winning the final race of the year at the Homebush Street Circuit.

The six races not won by Thompson included Race 2 at the Adelaide Street Circuit which was won in emotional circumstances by Jason Richards driving a Greg Murphy Racing Holden VE Commodore, the Brad Jones Racing driver from the V8 Supercars Championship taking a guest drive during a break in his treatment for a serious illness. Other race wins were attained by Tim Blanchard who won the reverse grid race at the Townsville Street Circuit in a Ford BF Falcon, Scott McLaughlin, who won Race 1 at Queensland Raceway in a Stone Brothers Racing Ford BF Falcon, former series winner Andrew Jones who won the reverse grid race at Queensland Raceway in a Brad Jones Racing prepared Holden VE Commodore and Jack Perkins, who won two late season races at Sandown Raceway and the Homebush Street Circuit.

Calendar

The 2011 Fujitsu V8 Supercar Series was contested over seven rounds:

Teams and drivers
The following teams and drivers contested the 2011 Fujitsu V8 Supercar Series. This was the last season in which the Holden VZ Commodore was eligible to compete.

Series standings

See also
2011 V8 Supercar season

References

External links
 2011 Operations Manual, www.v8supercars.com.au, as archived at web.archive.org

Fujitsu V8 Supercars Series
Supercars Development Series